Ooperipatus is a genus of Australian velvet worms in the Peripatopsidae family. All species in this genus are oviparous and have 15 pairs of oncopods (legs).

Species 
The genus contains the following species:

 Ooperipatus birrgus Reid, 2000
 Ooperipatus caesius Reid, 2000
 Ooperipatus centunculus Reid, 1996
 Ooperipatus costatus  Reid, 1996
 Ooperipatus hispidus Reid, 1996
 Ooperipatus lepidus Reid, 2000
 Ooperipatus nebulosus Reid, 2000
 Ooperipatus oviparus (Dendy, 1895)
 Ooperipatus porcatus Reid, 2000
 Ooperipatus pulchellus Reid, 1996
 Ooperipatus silvanus Reid, 2000

References 

Onychophorans of Australasia
Onychophoran genera
Taxa named by Arthur Dendy